Viktoriya Ivanivna Styopina (born 21 February 1976 in Zaporozhia, Soviet Union), known as Vita Styopina, is a Ukrainian high jumper.

Biography
She won the bronze medal at the 2004 Summer Olympics, setting a new personal best of 2.02m in the process.

Styopina jumped an indoor personal best of 1.94 m to win the 2000 edition of the Hochsprung mit Musik.

Achievements
 2nd IAAF World Athletics Final — Silver medal
 2004 Summer Olympics — Bronze medal

See also
 Female two metres club

References

External links
 
 
 
 

1976 births
Living people
Ukrainian female high jumpers
Athletes (track and field) at the 1996 Summer Olympics
Athletes (track and field) at the 2004 Summer Olympics
Athletes (track and field) at the 2008 Summer Olympics
Olympic bronze medalists for Ukraine
Olympic athletes of Ukraine
Sportspeople from Zaporizhzhia
Athletes (track and field) at the 2012 Summer Olympics
Medalists at the 2004 Summer Olympics
Olympic bronze medalists in athletics (track and field)
21st-century Ukrainian women